Robert Bruce Morris (November 3, 1902 – November 1986) was an American basketball head coach as well as former collegiate athlete. He served as the head coach for the Providence Steamrollers, a Basketball Association of America team, in 1946–47. Morris then guided Brown University's men's basketball team from 1947 to 1954. He accumulated a 28–32 record with Providence and overall 61–87 record with Brown. While at Brown, one of his players was future College Football Hall of Fame coach Joe Paterno, who earned two varsity letters.

As an athlete, Morris lettered in football, baseball, and track at East Stroudsburg University of Pennsylvania. He was a member of a Penn Relays-winning track team and was later inducted into the school's athletic hall of fame in 1987. Upon the conclusion of his coaching career he became a schoolteacher and high school coach at Pawtucket High School in Pawtucket, Rhode Island.

Head coaching record

Professional

|-
| style="text-align:left;"|PRO
| style="text-align:left;"|
| 60||28||32||.466|| style="text-align:center;"|4th in Eastern||0||0||0||.000
| style="text-align:center;"|Missed Playoffs
|-
| style="text-align:left;"|Career
| ||60||28||32||.466|| ||0||0||0||.000||  |

College

References

1902 births
1986 deaths
Brown Bears men's basketball coaches
College men's track and field athletes in the United States
East Stroudsburg Warriors baseball players
East Stroudsburg Warriors football players
High school basketball coaches in the United States
Providence Steamrollers coaches